Ankur Rathee (born 24 March 1991) is an Indian born-American actor. He is best known for his role in the Amazon Prime Video show Four More Shots Please (2019-2020).

Early life 
Ankur was born in Hisar, Haryana. He graduated from Princeton University where he trained under Tony Award winner John Rando, Tony Award nominee Leigh Silverman, and Academy Award nominee Christina Lazaridi. He also briefly studied filmmaking at USC School of Cinematic Arts. After graduation, Ankur worked in New York City for an advertising technology firm before quitting his job and pursuing acting full-time.

Career 
As a student, Ankur was an active member of musical theater productions, a cappella groups, and dance companies. He began his professional acting career in New York City with short films and off-Broadway theater. In 2018, he found his way back to the stage, alongside Ila Arun and K. K. Raina, as the lead in Tammy Ryan's, Baby's Blues which premiered at the National Centre for the Performing Arts. However, it was his portrayal of Arjun Nair, the young intern opposite Kirti Kulhari, in Four More Shots Please! that first garnered him notable recognition. That same year he played Arjun Mathur’s gay love interest in another Amazon Prime series, Made in Heaven. Ankur made his feature film debut with veteran actor Naseeruddin Shah in The Tashkent Files. In 2020, he was back on the big screen again with Taapsee Pannu in Thappad and with Jim Sarbh in Taish. Ankur went on to book his first lead roles with the crime thriller series, Undekhi, and the Marathi film, Nirmal En Route. He also portrayed the role of Indian freedom fighter, Bhagat Singh, in the film Sarabha: Cry for Freedom.

Personal life 
Ankur is married to actress Anuja Joshi since 2022, daughter of former child artist, Master Alankar, and niece of Pallavi Joshi. In the middle of the Covid-19 pandemic, Ankur drove 4,500 kilometers cross-country to propose on 19 July 2020.

Filmography

Films

Web series

References

External links

1991 births
Living people